The S2 district lies within in the City of Sheffield, South Yorkshire, England.  The district contains 69 listed buildings that are recorded in the National Heritage List for England.  Of these, four are listed at Grade II*, the middle grade, and the others are at Grade II, the lowest grade.  The district is in the east of the city of Sheffield, and covers the areas of Arbourthorne, Highfield, Hyde Park, Manor, Norfolk Park, Park Hill, Wybourn and part of Heeley.

For neighbouring areas, see listed buildings in Sheffield City Centre, listed buildings in S4, listed buildings in S7, listed buildings in S8, listed buildings in S9, listed buildings in S12, listed buildings in S13 and listed buildings in S14.



Key

Buildings

References 

 - A list of all the listed buildings within Sheffield City Council's boundary is available to download from this page.

Sources

 
Sheffield